Vaya may refer to:

Vaya, an Australian mobile service provider owned by Amaysim
Vaya (film), a 2016 South African film
Vaya (EP), a 1999 release by American band At the Drive-In
Lucca Vaya (fl. 1820s), physician and participant in the Greek War of Independence

See also

Vaya con Dios (disambiguation)
Vayas, Puerto Rico